That's Good, That's Bad may refer to:

That's Good, That's Bad (Desperate Housewives)
That's Good, That's Bad, children's book by Margery Cuyler
That's Good, That's Bad (Frankie Laine song), Laine, Jo Stafford 1951
"That's Good, That's Bad", song by George Jones, composed by Ervin Drake, Jimmy Shirl 1951
"That's Good, That's Bad", comedy sketch by Archie Campbell, performed by Homer and Jethro, Chet Atkins 1960